Robin Hood Daffy is a 1958 Warner Bros. Merrie Melodies cartoon, directed by Chuck Jones and written by Michael Maltese. The short was released on March 8, 1958, and stars Daffy Duck as Robin Hood and Porky Pig as Friar Tuck.

It was the last of Jones' parody cartoons with the duo, and the last appearance of Porky in a theatrical cartoon directed by Jones during the Golden Age of Animation. It was also the second parody of Robin Hood directed by Chuck Jones, after the 1949 Bugs Bunny short Rabbit Hood. An edited version of Robin Hood Daffy was included in the theatrical film The Bugs Bunny/Road Runner Movie (1979).

Plot 
The film features Daffy Duck in the role of legendary outlaw Robin Hood, and opens to the strains of his playing a song on a long-necked lute similar to a tambouras. As he prances along singing, he trips and tumbles down a hill (still singing), off a bank and into a river.

Watching is Porky Pig, as a Friar Tuck figure, who laughs uproariously at Daffy's inglorious plunge. The annoyed Daffy tries to prove his skill with a quarterstaff ("Actually, it's a buck-and-a-quarter quarterstaff, but I'm not telling him that!") on a tree-trunk bridge, but manages to hit himself in the face with it, bending his bill in what becomes a recurring visual gag throughout the film. Undeterred, Daffy tries again, but while he is spinning his quarterstaff, Porky stops it with a wooden dowel, resulting in Daffy himself spinning around and falling back into the river. He gets out of the water and confronts Porky, who has once again been reduced to fits of laughter. Daffy is initially annoyed, but then starts to laugh along with him before becoming annoyed again.

Having given up showing off, Daffy attempts to leave, but Porky follows and asks the "traveling clown" if he knows the whereabouts of Robin Hood's hideout as he "wouldst fain join me up with his band of jolly outlaws". Daffy proudly announces that he is Robin Hood, but Porky disbelieves him.

In order to prove that he is Robin Hood, Daffy informs Porky that he will attempt to rob a rich traveler on a bouncing mule and give his money "to some poor unworthy slob". Watched by Porky, Daffy pitifully fails in each and every attempt he makes to stop the traveler, usually injuring himself in the process. Daffy first attempts to shoot the traveler with an arrow, but ends up firing himself from his own bow and crashing into a tree and ends up with his head stuck through the trunk. Moments later, Daffy, (still with his head through the trunk of the now uprooted tree), confronts Porky who sarcastically says "Oh I er don't how I could have doubted you. Shall we spend the gold all in one place?" Daffy retorts "Ho ho. Very funny. Ha ha it is to laugh". Daffy then attempts to swing on a rope and kidnap the rich traveler, but slams into a succession of trees (repeatedly crying "Yoicks! And awa-aaay!" with each launch) and after chopping the trees down to clear a path, his final attempt results in him slamming face-first into a boulder. Daffy again tries to swing down from a rope, which is this time attached to a huge iron ball. He ends up slamming face-first into the side of a cliff and on to the ground (like he is doing the splits) causing the iron ball to drop down on top of him, flattening him. Daffy then attempts to fire a spear from a rubber band stretched between two trees, but it ends up forming a bridge so that the rich traveler can cross a ravine.

Eventually, the rich traveler, completely oblivious to Daffy's increasingly desperate attempts to rob him, reaches his castle unharmed, despite Daffy's final attempt to rob him by standing in front of the entrance (And getting crushed by the drawbridge as a result). This convinces Porky that Daffy is  "just not Robin Hood". The frustrated Daffy finally gives up, and in the final scene walks on with a tonsured head and wearing a habit, having decided to become a friar himself, he tells Porky; "Never mind joining me, I'll join you. Shake hands with Friar Duck!" As the film closes, Daffy's bill bends back up one more time.

Reception
Linda Simensky writes, "Robin Hood Daffy is a visual delight abounding with physical gags, bold colors — bright green against a yellow sky — and layouts and backgrounds that complement a leotard-wearing duck swinging through the trees on a rope. Daffy gets some classic moments, including a lute song and some arrow gags, but by the end he is fairly unsuccessful as a Robin Hood and gives it all up. As Daffy himself notes, 'Ha ha. It is to laugh.'"

Home media
Robin Hood Daffy, along with Rabbit Hood, is available as an extra on the DVD (and later the Blu-ray) edition of The Adventures of Robin Hood. The short is also available on the Looney Tunes Golden Collection: Volume 3 and Essential Daffy Duck DVD sets, as well as the Looney Tunes Platinum Collection: Volume 1 Blu-ray set.

See also
 List of American films of 1958

References

External links

 
 

1958 films
1958 animated films
1958 short films
Merrie Melodies short films
Short films directed by Chuck Jones
Robin Hood films
Robin Hood parodies
Daffy Duck films
Porky Pig films
Films scored by Milt Franklyn
1950s Warner Bros. animated short films
Films with screenplays by Michael Maltese
1950s English-language films